VP9 is a video compression standard being developed by Google.

VP9 or VP-9 may also refer to:

 VP-9, Patrol Squadron 9, a U.S. Navy patrol squadron 
 Heckler & Koch VP9, a German polymer-framed striker-fired pistol
 B&T VP9, a Swiss integrally-suppressed bolt-action pistol with the design based on the Welrod
 VP9, a viral protein; for example in Banna virus